Nagykozár is a village in Baranya county, Hungary. Until the end of World War II, the Inhabitants was Danube Swabians. Mostly of the former German Settlers was expelled to Germany and Austria in 1945–1948, about the Potsdam Agreement.

References

Populated places in Baranya County